University of Mediterranean Karpasia (UMK; in ) is a private university founded in North Nicosia, Northern Cyprus in 2012.

The medium of instruction at University of Mediterranean Karpasia is English in most departments.

University of Mediterranean Karpasia has 4 Faculties and 1 School offering courses at undergraduate and postgraduate levels. An English Preparatory School is available for those who need to improve their English before starting to study at the specialist programs of the faculties.

The university's first graduation ceremony with 72 graduations was on 8 July 2015.

Organization

Vocational Schools
 Vocational School of Karpasia

Faculties
Faculty of Business
Faculty of Air Transportation
Faculty of Law
Faculty of Tourism and Hospitality Management

Institutes
 Institute of Social Sciences

Campus
The university is currently located into two city campus in North Nicosia, Northern Cyprus.

References 

Educational institutions established in 2012
Universities in Northern Cyprus
Universities and colleges in Cyprus
Education in Nicosia
2012 establishments in Northern Cyprus